Sarah Nambawa (born 23 September 1985 in Kampala) is a Ugandan athlete specialising in the triple jump. She is a two-time African Champion.

International competition

References

1985 births
Living people
Sportspeople from Kampala
Ugandan female triple jumpers
Ugandan female athletes
Commonwealth Games competitors for Uganda
Athletes (track and field) at the 2010 Commonwealth Games
World Athletics Championships athletes for Uganda
Competitors at the 2009 Summer Universiade
20th-century Ugandan women
21st-century Ugandan women